Jimabad (also Romanized as Jīmābād) is a village in Meyami Rural District, Razaviyeh District, Mashhad County, Razavi Khorasan Province, Iran. At the 2006 census, its population was 4,199, in 1,086 families.

References 

Populated places in Mashhad County